Joseph Khalil Aoun is a Lebanese Commander of the Lebanese Armed Forces since 2017.

Career
Aoun joined the Lebanese army in 1983. He trained abroad, especially in the United States and Syria. He also underwent counter-terrorism training in the United States in 2008 and Lebanon in 2013. He has headed the army's 9th Infantry Brigade since 2015.

On 8 March 2017, the Lebanese government appointed Joseph Aoun commander-in-chief of the Lebanese Armed Forces, replacing Jean Kahwaji.

Following the protests in Lebanon and with the deadlock of the formation of the government, General Aoun made a speech on March 8, 2021 concerning the local and regional situation. Aoun focused on the economic crisis and its impact on the military staff and addressed the political class: "Where are we going? What are you waiting for? What do you plan to do? We have warned more than once of the danger of the situation." His speech went viral on social media.

Personal life
Joseph Aoun is married to Nehmat Nehmeh and father of two children Khalil and Nour. He is fluent in Arabic, French and English.

References

Living people
1964 births
Lebanese Maronites
Lebanese military personnel
People from Mount Lebanon Governorate